Conor O'Sullivan may refer to:
Conor O'Sullivan (hurler) (born 1989), Irish hurler
Conor O'Sullivan (make-up artist), make-up artist
Conor O'Sullivan (rugby league), Irish rugby player